Scido is a comune (municipality) in the Province of Reggio Calabria in the Italian region Calabria, located about  southwest of Catanzaro and about  northeast of Reggio Calabria.

The municipality of Scido contains the frazione (subdivision) Santa Giorgia.

Scido borders the following municipalities: Cosoleto, Delianuova, San Luca, Santa Cristina d'Aspromonte.

Demographic evolution

References

Cities and towns in Calabria